Greg Rasmussen (born 30 April 1956) is a 2023 Indianapolis Prize nominee and wildlife conservation biologist who has studied the critically endangered Painted dog, previously known as the African wild dog, for over thirty years, one of the longest studies of the species ever conducted. Working in the Hwange National Park area in Zimbabwe, he is the founder and executive directorof Painted Dog Research Trust (PDRT) whose mission is to both continue with research into the species and build for the future of conservation by meaningfully incorporating Zimbabwean students to develop local capacity and tomorrow’s conservationists. His work has proven successful with the national pack size doubling thanks to these dedicated efforts. He is also the founder and a former director of the Painted Dog Conservation (PDC) project in Zimbabwe  which grew to be a model for conservation, incorporating antipoaching, community outreach, and child conservation education, developing long-term community conservation.

Dr. Rasmussen is a research associate and part time lecturer at the University of Zimbabwe; he is also affiliated with the Wildlife Conservation Research Unit at Oxford University in the UK where he completed his PhD. He has a diverse range of research interests with his most recent interests being trans-boundary conservation. He possesses an unswerving commitment to conservation as well as to those who wish to become a part of saving Nature.

Dr. Rasmussen embarks on an annual Painted Dog awareness and fundraising tour throughout the United States and Europe, visiting zoos, universities and donors. Every three years he attends the International African Painted Dog Conference bringing together wildlife managers, biologists, conservationists and zoo professionals from around the world to enhance and improve the care of African painted dogs in managed care and to assist in field conservation in the wild.

Background
Dr. Rasmussen was born in London but at eleven years old, his parents moved him to what was then Rhodesia (Modern day Zimbabwe) where he developed a strong affinity for wildlife to the point of spending all his spare time in the laboratories of the Natural History Museum. After attending Falcon College, he joined the British merchant Navy and studied in Southampton at the Warsash Naval College. Even on the ships he took an interest in research, and in 1978 he received the Bracknell (UK) award for his work on ocean currents in the Atlantic. He then served on the Transglobe Expedition bound for North & South Poles under Sir Ranolf before returning to Africa to complete two more degrees in order to pursue a wildlife career. In 1988, Joshua Ginsberg offered him a job observing painted dogs in Hwange National Park. Dr. Rasmussen established the Painted Dog Conservation project in 2002 and Painted Dog Research Trust in 2014.

In 2003, Dr. Rasumussen was involved in a plane crash which left him severely injured and alone in the African bush. He survived and was eventually rescued. He almost lost his feet but doctors saved them, and as a result of the incident he is  shorter.  The story of his survival is featured in season one of I Shouldn't Be Alive, a documentary series broadcast on the Discovery Channel in the United States in an episode entitled "Jaws of Death".  In the United Kingdom, it was broadcast as "Thrown to the Lions" on Channel 4 where the series is called Alive.

References

External links
Painted Dog Conservation Project website
Painted Dog Research Trust website

Living people
English people of Danish descent
British environmentalists
1955 births
Scientists from London
English emigrants to Zimbabwe
Alumni of Falcon College
Survivors of aviation accidents or incidents